Hurricane Erin was the longest-lived hurricane in the 2001 Atlantic hurricane season. The sixth tropical depression, fifth tropical storm, and first hurricane of the season, Erin developed from a tropical wave on September 1. After strengthening to a  tropical storm as it moved to the west-northwest, wind shear weakened Erin and caused it to degenerate into a remnant low on September 5. The remnants re-organized into a tropical depression the next day, and Erin strengthened into a hurricane on September 9 while moving northwestward. This was the latest date for the first hurricane of the season since Hurricane Diana on September 10, 1984. Erin quickly intensified and reached peak winds of  later on September 9. A trough turned Erin to the northeast, and after passing just east of Cape Race, Newfoundland it became extratropical on September 15. The extratropical remnant continued northeastward and was absorbed into another extratropical storm near Greenland on September 17.

Large swells from the hurricane produced rough surf and rip currents along the East Coast of the United States. In Newfoundland, Erin dropped moderate amounts of rain and gusty winds, though no damage was reported. Throughout its path, Erin caused no casualties, no injuries, and minor damage.

Meteorological history 

A tropical wave moved off the coast of Africa on August 30. It almost immediately displayed signs of tropical cyclone formation with the development of deep convection and curved rainbands. Organization continued, and late on August 30 Dvorak classifications began on the system. On August 31, after passing well south of the Cape Verde islands, the system stopped its organization trend. Convection became sporadic, and the system became poorly organized as it moved westward at 20 mph (32 km). However, environmental conditions remained favorable. On September 1, the cloud pattern became better organized, and a low-level circulation quickly developed.

Located to the south of a mid-level ridge, the depression moved to the west-northwest. With weak to moderate upper-level wind shear over the system, the depression gradually organized and intensified into Tropical Storm Erin on September 2. Though Erin had favorable upper-level outflow and developing convection, the inner core of the storm remained disorganized. However, an upper-level low to the northwest of Erin produced strong vertical shear over the storm, and Erin quickly weakened as the storm's low-level circulation center became exposed to the southwest of the deep convection. The shear slightly abated on September 4, allowing Erin to briefly re-strengthen. However, the storm remained disorganized, and following an increase in southwesterly wind shear, Erin began another weakening trend. On September 5, Erin weakened to a tropical depression, and hours later, the storm's low-level circulation dissipated.

The remnant low-pressure area continued to the west-northwest, and on September 6, the system gradually produced deep convection. The depression moved to the north-northeast, then turned to the north-northwest, and regained tropical storm status on September 7. Erin steadily intensified, and its convection and cloud pattern became much better organized on September 8.

The hurricane maintained peak strength for 18 hours before slowly weakening. Its weakening trend was slower than usual due to warmer than usual water temperatures, and by late on September 10 Erin weakened to a Category 2 hurricane. Multiple short-wave troughs weakened the western portion of the subtropical ridge, and on September 11, Erin decelerated as it turned to the east. A strengthening mid- to upper-level trough over eastern Canada turned the hurricane to the northeast. It gradually accelerated its forward motion, and on September 15, after weakening to a strong tropical storm, Erin passed just east of Cape Race, Newfoundland. Convection gradually diminished as it moved through the north Atlantic Ocean, and later on September 15, Erin transitioned into an extratropical storm. The extratropical storm continued northeastward, and after crossing over southern Greenland, Erin's remnant merged with a high-latitude cyclonic flow to the east of Greenland on September 17.

Impact and preparations 

When the hurricane appeared to pose a threat to Bermuda, its government issued a hurricane watch. Around 24 hours before Erin made its closest approach, the watch was upgraded to a hurricane warning. Initial forecasts indicated Erin would pass within  of the island. As a result, ferry and bus transport were suspended. Officials prepared a school to be used as an emergency shelter, though few people used it.
The threat of the hurricane cancelled several flights in and out of the Bermuda International Airport, stranding hundreds of travellers. Cruise ships and cargo ships also cancelled or delayed their arrivals. The strongest winds of Erin remained to the east of the island. Moderate winds downed several trees onto power lines, leaving dozens of homes without power for several hours. Prolonged durations of strong waves resulted in coastal beach erosion. Large waves broke a boat from its moorings, though two men swam through the rough seas to prevent the yacht from running aground. The storm produced rainfall on the island, yet no flooding was reported. Little structural damage occurred on Bermuda, and there were no reported injuries or casualties.

Swells from Erin produced rip currents along the North Carolina coastline. Officials at the National Hurricane Center cautioned authorities and residents to monitor the rough seas.

No damage was reported in Canada.

See also 

 Other storms of the same name
List of Bermuda hurricanes
 Timeline of the 2001 Atlantic hurricane season

References

External links 

 NHC Tropical Cyclone Report for Hurricane Erin
 NHC advisory archives for Hurricane Erin
 
 

Category 3 Atlantic hurricanes
2001 Atlantic hurricane season
Cape Verde hurricanes
Hurricanes in Bermuda
Hurricanes in Canada
Erin